Jane Barbro Iréne Cederqvist (1 July 1945 – 15 January 2023) was a Swedish freestyle swimmer. In 1960, she set two world records, won a silver medal at the 1960 Summer Olympics, and became the youngest person and the first woman to receive the Svenska Dagbladet Gold Medal. The following year she retired from swimming and later became a government official.

Biography
Cederqvist grew up in the suburbs of Stockholm. She learned to swim at age 6, and at age 12 started training in a club. Within a few years she became a world top freestyle swimmer, and won a bronze medal at the 1958 World Junior Championships. She finished second in the 400 m freestyle at the 1960 Summer Olympics in Rome, and a few days later set a new world record in the 1500 m freestyle in Sweden. Just before the games she broke another world record, in the 800 m freestyle.

In 1961 she quit swimming to focus on her studies. In 1970 she received her BA and in 1980 a PhD in history with a thesis titled Arbetare i strejk: studier rörande arbetarnas politiska mobilisering under industrialismens genombrott: Stockholm 1850–1909 (Workers on strike: the political mobilisation of the working class in Stockholm 1850–1909). She then took various jobs for central and local governments, such as department director at the Swedish National Audit Office for six years and then director of the Association of Local Authorities. From 1994, she worked at the Ministry of Industry, and in 1998 became director of the Swedish Museum of National Antiquities. Cederqvist had long wanted to become directly involved with history and was first excited with this job, but later became frustrated with the lack of funds and moved to the Ministry of Finance, where between 1999 and 2002 she acted as director-general of the Swedish Fortifications Agency and then worked as a tax analyst.

Cederqvist died after suffering from motor neurone disease on 15 January 2023, at the age of 77.

See also
World record progression 800 metres freestyle
World record progression 1500 metres freestyle

References

External links

External links
November 1960 Jane Cederqvist interview at SVT's open archive) 

1945 births
2023 deaths
Olympic swimmers of Sweden
Olympic silver medalists for Sweden
Swimmers at the 1960 Summer Olympics
Swimmers from Stockholm
World record setters in swimming
Swedish female freestyle swimmers
SK Neptun swimmers
Medalists at the 1960 Summer Olympics
Olympic silver medalists in swimming
Deaths from motor neuron disease